Anton Tarielyevich Sikharulidze (born 25 October 1976) is a Russian former pair skater. With Elena Berezhnaya, he is the 1998 and 1999 World champion, 1998 Olympic silver medalist and 2002 Olympic champion.

His first partner was Maria Petrova, with whom he became the 1994 and 1995 World Junior Champion. He began competing with Berezhnaya in 1996 after helping her recover from an accident with her previous partner. Within two years of the accident, Berezhnaya and Sikharulidze had established themselves as one of the best pair teams in the world. During their competitive career, they were coached by Tamara Moskvina at the Yubileyny Sports Palace in Saint Petersburg, Russia, and the Ice House in Hackensack, New Jersey. Their Olympic gold medals are shared with Canadian pair Jamie Salé and David Pelletier.

In September 2021 Netflix premiered docuseries Bad Sport that includes an episode ("Gold War") detailing the events of the 2002 Winter Olympics figure skating scandal. Sikharulidze appeared only in archival footage and did not participate in the documentary, though his former partner Berezhnaya did.

Early life 
Anton Sikharulidze was born on 25 October 1976 in Leningrad, now known as Saint Petersburg, to a Russian mother and Georgian father. His sister, Marina, is an economist, and his brother, Alexander, is a businessman.

Early career 
Sikharulidze asked his parents for skates after seeing a neighbor's boy with a pair. At the age of 15, he considered leaving the sport, feeling it was taking up a lot of his time and limiting his personal life, but his father encouraged him to persevere.

Sikharulidze took up pair skating at age 15 when asked by a coach. With Maria Petrova, he became the 1994 and 1995 World Junior Champion and placed as high as sixth at the senior Worlds in 1995. They trained under Ludmila Velikova and Nikolai Velikov at the Yubileyny Sports Palace in Saint Peterburg, Russia, despite the deteriorating and crowded facilities of the 1990s. Their last competition together was the European Championships at the end of January 1996. Sikharulidze and Petrova then parted ways due to a coaching disagreement. He wanted to work with Moskvina while Petrova preferred to remain with their old coaches.

Partnership with Elena Berezhnaya 
In late 1995, Elena Berezhnaya and Oleg Shliakhov of Latvia began training at the same rink, under coach Tamara Moskvina. Sikharulidze developed a friendship with Berezhnaya and Shliakhov began to perceive him as his rival. At the end of 1995, Shliakhov demanded that he and Berezhnaya train in Riga, Latvia for three weeks in preparation for the European Championships. Sikharulidze urged her to stay in Saint Petersburg but she believed she could manage a few weeks. Berezhnaya was seriously injured when Shliakhov's blade sliced into her skull while the pair were practicing a side-by-side camel spin in Riga on 9 January 1996. Two surgical operations were performed to remove bone fragments from her brain. The accident caused partial paralysis on her right side, and doctors were unsure if she would walk again. She also briefly lost the ability to speak.

During her hospitalization, Sikharulidze heard of the news, and traveled to Latvia to be with her, joining Moskvina. Berezhnaya was surprised and overjoyed to see him, but unable to speak or move. Shliakhov also arrived at the hospital with flowers but Berezhnaya did not wish to see him again. Her mother, Sikharulidze, and Moskvina took her back to Saint Petersburg, Russia where she could begin her rehabilitation. She was grateful for his support, saying she was "skinny, shaved, half-alive, almost a skeleton, and Anton so tenderly cared about me. Perhaps it was his belief in me that helped me recover so quickly."

Berezhnaya wished to return to the ice and doctors agreed that physical exercise would be therapeutic. On 15 March 1996, only two months after the accident, she began skating carefully with Sikharulidze's help and Moskvina observing. Berezhnaya said, "I didn't have any false dreams about the future. All I thought about was those first steps." Moskvina felt the pair looked promising, "They're a natural pair. They've got it – something magical."

With Berezhnaya's condition improving, the two began to consider the possibility of a competitive career together. She had made a nearly full recovery, although her speech remained slurred requiring speech therapy. Berezhnaya/Sikharulidze made their competitive debut in November 1996 at the Trophée Lalique, winning bronze. In December, they placed fifth at Cup of Russia, and then captured the silver medal at the Russian Nationals, earning them a berth to the European Championships. In January 1997 in Paris, Berezhnaya/Sikharulidze made the podium at their first Europeans together, obtaining the bronze medal. At the 1997 World Championships in March, their short program placed them provisionally in third, with two judges giving them first-place votes. However, the pair placed 12th in the long program and dropped to 9th overall.

1998 Olympic season 
The next season, Berezhnaya/Sikharulidze won the European Championship, defeating 1992 Olympic champion Artur Dmitriev with his new partner Oksana Kazakova, and the reigning World Champions Mandy Wötzel/Ingo Steuer. At only 20 and 21 years of age respectively, Berezhnaya/Sikharulidze had established themselves as gold-medal favorites going into the 1998 Winter Olympics in Nagano, Japan. Observers were impressed by their rapid progress. Ekaterina Gordeeva selected the pair as her and Sergei Grinkov's skating doubles in a documentary on the legendary team after her husband's death.

At the Olympics, the pair had one fall in the short program but their other elements were of high quality. In the long, they put themselves back in contention for the gold medal with a strong performance, until five seconds from the end when they had a surprising fall as Sikharulidze set her down from a closing star lift. Although disappointed by suddenly giving away their chance at the gold so close to the end of the program, Sikharulidze recovered from his shock and joked, "It's a new finish. If you don't like it, we'll change it, no problem." The quality of the rest of their skating earned them the silver medal ahead of Wötzel/Steuer, while Kazakova/Dmitriev claimed the title. Former Japanese singles skater Yuko Kawaguchi became inspired to switch to pair skating after seeing Elena Berezhnaya at the Nagano Olympics.

Post-1998 Olympics 
Following the Olympics, Berezhnaya/Sikharulidze competed at the 1998 World Championships where they won the gold medal. Later in the year, they spent some time training at the Stamford Twin Rinks in Stamford, Connecticut. They won 1998 Skate America and 1998 NHK Trophy. In January 1999, they had to withdraw from the European Championships after the short program due to Berezhnaya having the flu. They won their second world title at the 1999 World Championships in March 1999.

The Yubileyny Sports Palace ice rink then closed for renovations, forcing the pair and Moskvina to relocate to Hackensack, New Jersey's Ice House in the summer of 1999. Berezhnaya/Sikharulidze struggled at Skate America in October 1999, placing third, but regained their form to win Skate Canada in November. Moskvina would later admit Sikharulidze had become distracted by life in a new country and was not as focused on training. In February 2000, the pair won gold at the 2000 Europeans but were stripped of their medals after Berezhnaya tested positive for pseudoephedrine, a substance whose ban was lifted temporarily between 2004 and 2010 before being banned again. This resulted in a three-month disqualification from the date of the test, and the medal being stripped. She stated that she had taken cold medication approved by a doctor but had failed to inform the ISU as required. The pair missed the World Championships that year as a result of the disqualification.

Berezhnaya/Sikharulidze developed a rivalry with Canadians Jamie Salé and David Pelletier. The 2001 World Championships were held in Salé/Pelletier's home country of Canada. Although Salé fell on the triple toe loop in the short program and then singled her double Axel in the long, Salé/Pelletier were awarded gold ahead of Berezhnaya/Sikharulidze.

The injury having delayed their preparations, Berezhnaya/Sikharulidze used their Charlie Chaplin program at the start of the season and debuted their new long program to Meditation de Thais at the Grand Prix Final in December. The pair decided to keep their new programs for the Olympics, while their rivals abandoned their new long program, with which they had been struggling, and decided to reuse their old Love Story program. The New York Times speculated that the judging might be influenced by the crowd response, with the familiar music of Love Story having more potential to draw louder applause in North America and the judges not being immune to human reactions.

2002 Olympics 

At the 2002 Winter Olympics in Salt Lake City, both pairs skated strong short programs, after which Berezhnaya/Sikharulidze were in first and Salé/Pelletier, who had a fall at the end of their program, second. In the long program, Berezhnaya/Sikharulidze skated a good program although Sikharulidze had a stumble on a jump element before quickly regaining unison with his partner. Salé/Pelletier, meanwhile, had no obvious mistakes. Four judges placed the Canadians first, while five had Berezhnaya/Sikharulidze as the winners, with the Canadians receiving higher technical scores and the Russians higher presentation scores. They were awarded the gold and the Canadians the silver. The result sparked a controversy with the media emphasizing Sikharulidze's stepout, although there was no media criticism a year earlier when Salé/Pelletier were awarded gold at the 2001 World Championships. The commentators received criticism for failing to mention Berezhnaya/Sikharulidze's strengths, with some observers stating that the pair had performed a more challenging program with greater speed, more interweaving moves and transitions, and less distance between the partners.

The International Skating Union's Technical Committee decided to look into the matter, first approaching French judge Marie-Reine Le Gougne, the only Western judge in favor of the Russian pair. She allegedly said that she had been intimidated by the head of the French skating organization into voting for the Russian pair in exchange for an advantage for the French couple in the ice dancing competition, which was to follow a few days later. A second gold medal was awarded to the Canadian pair, and the IOC and ISU decided to declare both pairs as Olympic co-champions. Later, Le Gougne rescinded her earlier statement and declared she had voted according to her honest assessment of the performances but had been pressured to say otherwise.

Later skating career 
In May 2003, Berezhnaya/Sikharulidze confirmed they had retired from competitive skating. From 2002 to 2006, they toured with Stars on Ice, then returned to Russia.

Sikharulidze makes occasional appearances in Russian ice shows. In 2006, he competed in a Channel One (Russia) show Stars on Ice (Russian: Звёзды на льду), partnered with Natalia Ionova (later replaced by Yulia Barsukova due to injury). In 2007, he skated in the Channel One show Ice Age (Russian: Ледниковый период), partnered with Anastasia Volochkova. In 2010, he joined another edition of Ice Age, teaming up with Zara.

Political career 

In 2006, he became a member of the political party United Russia. In 2007, he was elected to the Legislative Assembly of Saint Petersburg. On 2 December 2007, he was elected to the State Duma. He is the Chairman of the Russian State Duma Committee for Physical Culture and Sport.

In 2010, he registered as a candidate for the presidency of the Figure Skating Federation of Russia, but withdrew after the constitution was altered, stating that the changes left the president as nothing more than a figurehead.

Personal life 
Sikharulidze and Berezhnaya had an on-and-off romantic relationship between 1996 and 2002; they remain close friends. In August 2010, Sikharulidze became the godfather to Berezhnaya's son. He was married to Yana Lebedeva from 2011 to 2013. With his partner, Viktoria, he has a son, Georgiy, born on 24 March 2014 near Moscow.

Programs

With Berezhnaya 
Eligible career

Professional career

With Petrova

Results

With Berezhnaya

With Petrova

References

External links 

 
 Elena Berezhnaya/Anton Sikharulidze at pairsonice.net
 Maria Petrova/Anton Sikharulidze at pairsonice.net

Russian male pair skaters
Olympic figure skaters of Russia
Figure skaters at the 1998 Winter Olympics
Figure skaters at the 2002 Winter Olympics
Living people
Olympic gold medalists for Russia
Olympic silver medalists for Russia
Figure skaters from Saint Petersburg
Fifth convocation members of the State Duma (Russian Federation)
1976 births
Olympic medalists in figure skating
World Figure Skating Championships medalists
European Figure Skating Championships medalists
World Junior Figure Skating Championships medalists
Medalists at the 2002 Winter Olympics
Medalists at the 1998 Winter Olympics
Russian sportspeople of Georgian descent
Goodwill Games medalists in figure skating
Season-end world number one figure skaters
Russian sportsperson-politicians
Competitors at the 1998 Goodwill Games
Competitors at the 2001 Goodwill Games
Russian people of Georgian descent
Members of Legislative Assembly of Saint Petersburg